Qingyun Ma (born 1965) is a Chinese architect.

Early life and education
Born in Xi'an, Shaanxi province, Ma received a bachelor's degree in Civil Engineering in Architecture from Tsinghua University in Beijing. He studied architecture at the Graduate School of Fine Art at the University of Pennsylvania.

Career

Practise
In New York, he worked for several years at the firm Kohn Pedersen Fox. Also he became close to Rem Koolhaas on the first Harvard Project on the City, which he organized resulting in the book The Great Leap Forward.

In 1996, Ma founded MADA s.p.a.m.  The architectural firm has to date built over 1,204,000 square meters. In 2000, MADA s.p.a.m. formally established itself in Beijing, moving to Shanghai the following year. Included amongst MADA s.p.a.m's works are Qingpu Community Island in Shanghai, the Centennial TV and Radio Center in Xi'an, and Tianyi Square in Ningbo.

Teaching
Ma taught architecture in China at Shenzhen University, Tongji University, and Nanjing University; in Europe at the Berlage, the ETH, the Ecole Speciale d'Architecture in Paris and in Germany; and in the United States at Harvard University, the University of Pennsylvania, and Columbia University. Ma was the Dean of the University of Southern California School of Architecture from January 2007 through June 2017. In April 2020, Ma began serving as a member of the Board of Governors for the historic The School of Architecture founded by Frank Lloyd Wright in 1932.

See also
Ullens Center for Contemporary Art

References

External links 

New Trends of Architecture in Europe and Asia-Pacific 2006-2007

1965 births
Harvard University faculty
Columbia University faculty
University of Southern California faculty
Chinese architects
Tsinghua University alumni
University of Pennsylvania School of Design alumni
Living people
Artists from Xi'an
Educators from Shaanxi